Brentwood is a neighbourhood in the northwest quadrant of Calgary, Alberta. It is bounded by John Laurie Boulevard to the north, Crowchild Trail to the south, Shaganappi Trail to the west, and Brisbois Drive & Charleswood Drive on the east. Nose Hill Park lies to the north of John Laurie Boulevard and is not part of Brentwood. 

Brentwood was established in 1960. It is represented in the Calgary City Council by the Ward 4 councillor.

Brentwood station is in Brentwood and about seven bus lines run through the neighborhood.

The Northland Village Mall is located in the western extremity of the neighbourhood.

Brentwood was scene to the 2014 Calgary stabbings.

Demographics

Residents in this community had a median household income of $56,305 in 2000, and there were 14.3% low income residents living in the neighbourhood. As of 2000, 22.7% of the residents were immigrants. A proportion of 15.7% of the buildings were condominiums or apartments, and 27.3% were used for renting.

Education
The following schools are located in Brentwood:
Brentwood Elementary School
Captain John Palliser Elementary
Dr. E. W. Coffin Elementary
Simon Fraser Junior High
Sir Winston Churchill Senior High
Ecole St. Luke Bilingual Elementary (Catholic)
Brebeuf Junior High
Rocky Mountain College

The University of Calgary grounds border the community to the southwest, and the Southern Alberta Institute of Technology is also located close to the neighbourhood.

See also
List of neighbourhoods in Calgary

References

External links
Brentwood Community Association

Neighbourhoods in Calgary